The year 706 BC was a year of the pre-Julian Roman calendar. In the Roman Empire, it was known as year 48 Ab urbe condita . The denomination 706 BC for this year has been used since the Early Middle Ages, when the Anno Domini calendar era became the prevalent method in Europe for naming years.

Events
 The Greek colony of Taranto is founded by settlers from Sparta.

Births

Deaths

References

700s BC